Michael Massaro (born 1970) is an American sportscaster and journalist who covers auto racing as a pit reporter for MAVTV's ARCA Menards Series coverage. He was previously a studio host and pit reporter for NASCAR on ESPN and NASCAR on NBC. He was born and raised in Manchester, Connecticut.

Career
Massaro was a host of NASCAR Now, NASCAR news and highlights show from 2009 to 2014. He had previously worked as a reporter for RPM 2Night during ESPN's first stint covering NASCAR which ended in 2000 (and 2002 for the Truck Series).

In late 2014, Massaro would join NBC Sports as a pit reporter for Sprint Cup and Xfinity Series races starting in 2015.

In December 2016, Massaro announced on his Facebook page that he would not be returning to NASCAR on NBC in 2017. Parker Kligerman would replace him as a pit reporter on NBC's Cup and Xfinity Series broadcasts. Massaro would remain with NBC and join NBC Connecticut as a news reporter. In 2022, Massaro returned to calling races as the pit reporter for MAVTV's ARCA Menards Series races, replacing Dave Reiff.

References

Living people
ESPN people
Sportspeople from Manchester, Connecticut
People from Ellington, Connecticut
1970 births